Scott Davis and David Pate were the defending champions, but lost in the first round to Nicolás Pereira and Pete Sampras.

Luke Jensen and Scott Melville won the title by defeating Pereira and Sampras 6–7(5–7), 7–6(8–6), 6–3 in the final.

Seeds

Draw

Draw

References

External links
 Official results archive (ATP)
 Official results archive (ITF)

Doubles
Verizon Tennis Challenge